The rivière Judith is a tributary of the Bécancour River. It flows in the city of Bécancour, in Bécancour Regional County Municipality, in the administrative region of Centre-du-Québec, in Quebec, in Canada.

Geography 

The main neighboring hydrographic slopes of the Judith River are:
 north side: Bécancour River, St. Lawrence River;
 east side: Bécancour River;
 south side: Lac Saint-Paul, Chenal d'en Haut;
 west side: Godefroy River.

The Judith River flows on  towards the northeast in the Sainte-Angèle-de-Laval sector, crossing Highway 30.

Its confluence is located opposite the north side of the village of Bécancour, just downstream from Cap des Mares and the Montesson Island.

Toponymy 
The toponym "Rivière Judith" was made official on August 17, 1978, at the Commission de toponymie du Québec.

See also 

 List of rivers of Quebec

References 

Rivers of Centre-du-Québec
Bécancour Regional County Municipality